Karma Kagyud Buddhist Centre is one of the several Tibetan Buddhism Vajrayana centers in Singapore,  operating from temporary premises while the permanent building is undergoing reconstruction. The temporary and permanent premises are both in Geylang.

History
Karma Kagyud Buddhist Centre was first initiated in 1979, and after a visit by the 16th Gyalwa Karmapa on 27 December 1980, the centre was officially founded on 17 April 1981 following a visit by Kunzig Shamar Rinpoche in Singapore. The centre subscribes with the Kagyud lineage of Tibetan Buddhism and advocates Trinley Thaye Dorje as the 17th Karmapa in the ongoing Karmapa Controversy.

See also
Buddhism in Singapore

References

External links
 Official Site
 

Buddhist organisations based in Singapore
Buddhist temples in Singapore
Tibetan Buddhism in Asia